Abraham Kuhn (January 28, 1838 – September 15, 1900) was an Alsatian otolarynologist born in Bissersheim, Rhineland-Palatinate.

He studied under Anton von Tröltsch (1829–1890) at the University of Würzburg, then continued his education at the École de Médecine in Strasbourg. In 1870, he published Traité pratique des maladies de l'oreille, a French translation of Tröltsch's Lehrbuch der Ohrenheilkunde.

During the Franco-Prussian War he served with the Croix-Rouge (French Red Cross) on the battlefields of Wissembourg and Wörth. Later on he became a lecturer (from 1873) at the renamed Kaiser-Wilhelm-Universität in Strassburg, where in 1881 he was appointed associate professor of otolaryngology and director of the clinic of ear diseases. After his death, he was succeeded at Strassburg by Paul Manasse.

During his career, Kuhn was only one of a handful of professors in Germany who specialized in the field of otology. Much of his scientific research dealt with comparative anatomy of the ear, in particular the inner ear's labyrinth. He also made significant contributions involving diagnosis and treatment of ear tumors.

Selected writings 
 Traité pratique des maladies de l'oreille (Paris 1870), translation with D.M. Levi of Anton Friedrich von Tröltsch's Lehrbuch der Ohrenheilkunde.
 Histologie des Häutigen Labyrinthes der Knochenfische (Leipzig 1878). 
 Neubildungen des Ohres und Vergleichende Anatomie des Ohres in: Hermann Schwartze's "Handbuch für Ohrenheilkunde" (Leipzig 1893).

References 
 Archives of Otology (biography)

 "This article incorporates translated text from an equivalent article at the German Wikipedia".

Bibliography 
  

1838 births
1900 deaths
People from Bad Dürkheim (district)
19th-century German Jews
Academic staff of the University of Strasbourg
People from the Rhine Province
German otolaryngologists